Serghei Secu (born 28 November 1972) is a Moldovan football manager and former footballer who played as defender.

Between 1991–1997 Secu has played 27 matches for Moldova national football team, scoring 1 goal.

He holds UEFA PRO manager licence.

International goals
Scores and results list Moldova's goal tally first.

Honours

Club
Tiligul-Tiras Tiraspol
Moldovan Championship
Runner-up: 1993–94, 1994–95, 1995–96, 1997–98
Moldovan Cup: 1993–94, 1994–95
Runner-up: 1995–96

References

External links
 
 
 
 
 
 

1972 births
Living people
Moldovan footballers
Moldova international footballers
Moldovan football managers
Footballers from Chișinău
CS Tiligul-Tiras Tiraspol players
FC Zhenis Astana players
Association football defenders
FC SKA-Khabarovsk players
Moldovan expatriate footballers
Expatriate footballers in Poland
Moldovan expatriate sportspeople in Poland
Expatriate footballers in Russia
Moldovan expatriate sportspeople in Russia
Expatriate footballers in Kazakhstan
Moldovan expatriate sportspeople in Kazakhstan
Expatriate footballers in Armenia
Moldovan expatriate sportspeople in Armenia
Moldovan Super Liga players
Moldovan Super Liga managers